Clavus suduirauti is a species of sea snail, a marine gastropod mollusk in the family Drilliidae.

Description
The shell grows to a length of 25 mm.

Distribution
This species occurs in the demersal zone in the Pacific Ocean off the Philippines.

References

 Bozzetti, Luigi. "Study of the collection of Mr. Emmanuel Guillot de Suduiraut with the descriptions of three new gastropod species (Fasciolariidae, Trochidae and Turridae)." Bulletin of the Institute of Malacology, Tokyo 3.4 (1997): 55–58.

External links
 
 Holotype at MNHN, Paris

suduirauti
Gastropods described in 1997